Lugard Road is a road located on Victoria Peak, Hong Kong, named after Sir Frederick Lugard, Governor of Hong Kong from 1907 to 1912.

Description 
It is a semi-circular  road on Victoria Peak that mainly follows the contours of the hillside, connecting Victoria Gap in the east to the Hatton Road-Harlech Road junction in the west. Joining Harlech Road seamlessly at its end, a circuit is formed around The Peak. Lugard Road is the initial section of Stage 1 of the  Hong Kong Trail. Most of Lugard Road enjoys dense tree cover, and a variety of tropical vegetation can be found along its length. The views of the city below from Lugard Road are variously described in travel guides as "stunning" and "spectacular".

Permits to use this road are only issued to residents for access to their properties.

History

The road is named after Sir Frederick Lugard, Governor of Hong Kong from 1907 to 1912.

The Public Works Department issued an invitation for sealed tenders by 2 June 1913 to form a section of roadway from Victoria Gap to High West Gap. The cost of the entire  road, whose construction was made difficult by the "rocky and precipitous nature of the hillside", was estimated at HK$55,000. In their 1913 annual report, the PWD noted that HK$11,373 had been spent on the  section completed in the year.

[…] the road will be principally used as a promenade, a wonderful panoramic view of the City, Harbour and surroundings
being obtainable from it. Starting from Victoria Gap, the road
contours the hillside below the Mount Austin Barracks, being
practically level until it reaches a point below Bishop’s Lodge,
whence it continues westwards with a rising grade of 1 in 18
to the end of the first section. It is 8 feet in width and is
generally cut out of the hillside. In some places, it has been
necessary to construct retaining walls in order to avoid excessive
cutting or to improve the alignment of the road.
The construction was interrupted by the First World War. The next section built after the war, to join the existing road with Harlech Road, is described having "a minimum width of 8 ft. throughout with a maximum gradient of 1 in 20". It comprises "1,448 lineal feet of reinforced concrete decking and beams carried on 87 cement concrete piers, 1,543 lineal feet of rubble retaining walling and 1,859 lineal feet of hillside benching". In 1920, the Director of Public Works reported that all the substantial pier work for the bridging, rubble retaining walls, cutting and channelling for that section had been completed. The steep terrain made progress slow, and challenges included "numerous dangerous boulders, weighing up to 45 tons each", which had to be removed. By the end of that year, all that still remained to be done was "a small amount of work consisting principally of bridge decking, railings, and road surfacing".

Construction was completed in March 1921, the total project cost being $88,165.

Houses

While the Peak is a prestigious address, there are few houses along Lugard Road. Not designed for vehicular traffic, its width is insufficient for cars to pass in most places, making the houses close to inaccessible. Furthermore, the escarpments present challenges for construction. There was controversy when planning permission was lodged (and granted) to convert one of the properties along it into a luxury hotel in 2013.

Built heritage 
 No. 1 Lugard Road, the Peak Tramways Office built about 1927 as a workshop, with an additional floor added in 1953, now serves as offices for the Peak Tramways Company. It has a highly unusual shape that can best be described as an arrowhead. It was listed as a Grade III historic building in 2010.
 No. 26 Lugard Road. Hong Kong Archive records show that a dwelling was constructed c.1890 on Rural Building Lot 52. The house was sold in 1899 to Joseph Charles Hoare, then Bishop of Victoria, for HK$34,000. The property, thus named "Bishop's Lodge", was owned by Hoare and passed to his wife upon his drowning in a typhoon in 1906. In 1917, the property was sold for $20,830 to Robert Hotung, who surrendered the lease to the Crown in June 1950, a process usually of exchange for other land.
 No. 27 Lugard Road. The oldest house in Lugard Road is a two-storey private residence located at No. 27 designed by Palmer and Turner and constructed in 1914. It was given Grade II historic building status by the Antiquities Advisory Board in September 2013. The neo-classical colonial mansion was designed by Lennox Godfrey Bird and owned by his brother Herbert until it was sold to the Taikoo Dockyard & Engineering Co. in 1930 and used as a residence for their staff. Butterfield & Swire (太古洋行), successor to Taikoo Dockyard, turned the house into a staff mess. In September 2012, the property was acquired for HK$384 million by Ashley Pacific, a company that also owns and runs the Butterfly Hotel and Serviced Apartment Group. The new owners submitted application to the Town Planning Board (TPB) to transform the property into an up-scale boutique hotel. Despite stiff objection from local groups and the District Council, the TPB approved the plan.
 No. 28 Lugard Road is a pitched roof bungalow built by Lennox Bird, constructed in 1924. It was owned and occupied by Bird up to the war, after which it was sold.
 No. 35 Lugard Road, Victoria Gap Substation, was built in 1928 by the Hongkong Electric Company to distribute electricity to different populated areas and serve as quarters for its engineers. The 4-storey neo-Georgian building still functions as a staff residence and an electric substation for the locality. The plant is located on the ground floor, while there is a flat on each of the remaining levels. It has been a Grade III historic building since 2010.

See also
 List of streets and roads in Hong Kong

References

External links 

 "No. 27 Lugard Road". Historic Building Appraisal, Leisure and Cultural Services Dept. p. N18

Victoria Peak
Roads on Hong Kong Island